Cervids are one of the most common wild herbivores of the world. Of these moose can grow up to 2.33 m tall and weigh as much as 820 kg. The smallest of them all is the northern pudu.

See also
 List of cervids

References

Deer
Cervids